Max Schäfer (17 January 1907 – 15 September 1990) was a German international footballer and manager.

References

1907 births
1990 deaths
Association football defenders
German footballers
Germany international footballers
TSV 1860 Munich players
German football managers
TSV 1860 Munich managers
FC Bayern Munich managers